Joaquín Anselmo María Albareda y Ramoneda, OSB (16 February 1892 – 19 July 1966) was a Spanish Cardinal of the Roman Catholic Church who served as Prefect of the Vatican Library from 1936 to 1962, and was elevated to the cardinalate in 1962.

Biography
Joaquín Albareda y Ramoneda was born in Barcelona to Vicente Albareda and his wife María Ramoneda. Entering the Order of Saint Benedict at Santa María de Montserrat in 1904, he took the name Anselmo María upon his profession on 4 November 1908. Ordained to the priesthood on 7 July 1915, Albareda then remained as a member of the Montserrat community until 1921. He furthered his studies from 1921 to 1923, attending the Athenaeum of St. Anselm in Rome and the Faculty of Palaeography and Archives in Freiburg.
Returning to the Montserrat monastery, he served as its archivist from 1923 to 1936.

On 19 June 1936 Albareda was appointed Prefect of the Vatican Library by Pope Pius XI. He was made Titular Abbot of Santa Maria de Ripoll on 5 May 1950, receiving the traditional abbatial blessing from Cardinal Eugène-Gabriel-Gervais-Laurent Tisserant on 26 August 1951. Pope John XXIII created Albareda Cardinal Deacon of S. Apollinare alle Terme Neroniane-Alessandrine in the consistory of 19 March 1962, on which date Albareda resigned as Prefect.

The Cardinal was named by Pope John as Titular Archbishop of Gypsaria on 5 April 1962. He received his episcopal consecration on the following 19 April from Pope John, with Cardinals Giuseppe Pizzardo and Benedetto Aloisi Masella serving as co-consecrators, in the Lateran Basilica. Albareda stepped down as Titular Archbishop the next day, 20 April. From 1962 to 1965, he attended the Second Vatican Council, during the course of which he was one of the cardinal electors who participated in the 1963 papal conclave that elected Pope Paul VI.

The Cardinal died in his native Barcelona, at age 74. He is buried at the Montserrat monastery.

See also 
 List of archivists

References

External links
Cardinals of the Holy Roman Church
Catholic-Hierarchy

1892 births
1966 deaths
Participants in the Second Vatican Council
People from Barcelona
Spanish archivists
20th-century Spanish cardinals
Cardinals created by Pope John XXIII
Spanish Benedictines